The Women's 400 Individual Medley (or "I.M.") at the 10th FINA World Swimming Championships (25m) was swum on 15 December 2010 in Dubai, United Arab Emirates. 28 swimmers swam in the morning preliminary heats, from which the top-8 advanced to the final that evening.

Records
Prior to the competition, the existing world and championship records were as follows.

The following records were established during the competition:

Results

Heats

Final

References

Individual medley 400 metre, Women's
World Short Course Swimming Championships
2010 in women's swimming